The Old Government House is a heritage-listed former "country" residence used by ten early governors of New South Wales between 1800 and 1847, located in Parramatta Park in Parramatta, New South Wales, in the greater metropolitan area of Western Sydney, New South Wales, Australia. It is considered a property of national and international significance as an archaeological resource. It also serves to demonstrate how the British Empire expanded and Australian society has evolved since 1788.

The poor quality of the original Sydney Government House, as well as crime and unsanitary conditions in the growing Sydney settlement convinced successive Governors of the desirability of a rural residence. In 1799 the second Governor, John Hunter, had the remains of Arthur Phillip's cottage cleared away, and a more permanent building erected on the same site.

Old Government House is furnished in the style of the early 1820s and is open to visitors. The grounds are of particular interest as they are a relatively undisturbed colonial-era reserve surrounded by what is now Australia's largest urban area. The practice of "firestick" land management conducted by the aboriginal Darug tribe, which once dwelt in the area, is evident from certain scars to be seen on trees still standing (their bark being removed to build canoes). Also, shells used to strengthen the mortar used in the House's construction have been found to originate from Aboriginal middens.

In July 2010 Old Government House and Domain was inscribed on the World Heritage List as one of 11 Australian sites with a significant association with convict transportation (i.e. the Australian Convict Sites) which together represent "the best surviving examples of large-scale convict transportation and the colonial expansion of European powers through the presence and labour of convicts"

The land the property is situated on is named Darug land, home to the Burramatta tribe. There is evidence of Aboriginal occupation on the site, such as middens.

History

Indigenous history
The Parramatta River valley, from Prospect to the sea, has been occupied by Aboriginal people for at least the last 10,000 years (Attenbrow, 2002:20). The Burramatta clan of the Dharug people occupied this area, and used its rich plant and animal resources. The river yielded crayfish, shellfish, eels, turtles, mullet and other fish with both the fresh and tidal portions a rich resource. The men fished from shore using special three pronged spears, and trapped and hunted native animals. The women usually fished from bark canoes using hooks fashioned from shell or bone, and traditionally dug yams from the riverbank and gathered berries, plant seeds and fruits. Animal skins provided clothing in cold weather and fur was braided into body belts for carrying tools and weapons (Kass et al. 1996: pp. 6–7).
 
Research has demonstrated that the presence of large and cohesive Aboriginal groups in the township of Parramatta represented a conspicuous and enduring aspect of the post-colonial periods of Parramatta's development. Parramatta was their traditional hunting and fishing grounds and this aspect of traditional use can be interpreted still in Parramatta Park through features such remnant indigenous plantings, scarred trees and the proximity to the Parramatta River and riverine features such as the anabranch of the Crescent and the "Island", a billabong type feature near the George Street gatehouse.

Governor Phillip (1788–1792)

Governor Arthur Phillip's instructions from King George III required him to begin cultivation immediately on landing (Kass et al. 1996: p. 9). Within days of the First Fleet's arrival at Sydney Cove, Phillip's servant Henry Dodd, who had some farming experience, was put in charge of convicts to clear and cultivate land at the head of Farm Cove. Immediate difficulties arose. Much of the seed had been ruined by weevils and overheating on the voyage and the local sandy soil and the February heat proved unsuitable for debilitated seed. Phillip was always acutely aware of the need for agricultural self-sufficiency as their stores would need to be supplemented within the year.
 
On Tuesday 22 April 1788, Phillip set off with a party to explore the headwaters of what is today known as the Parramatta River. Early on Thursday 24 April, they came across a natural phenomenon where the river had scoured into the side of a hill, forming an extensive river flat in a semi-circular shape and where the former course of the river had formed a billabong, or anabranch. Phillip named the feature the 'crescent', and from the top of the hill thousands of acres of what appeared to be arable land could be seen (Kass et al. 1996: pp. 11–12). The soil at the Crescent consisted of red podsolic clay soils with a deep mineralised acidic over-layer, a subsidiary heavy clay layer, and a substratum of weathered grey Ashfield shale of the Wianamatta Group (Walker 1961). Fortuitously, the area was located at both the limit of navigation on the Parramatta River, and also at the limit of tidal influence. Philip had found fertile land with a plentiful supply of fresh water which was accessible from Sydney Cove. In September when the Farm Cove crop failed, he realised that the land around the Cove would not support the colony and decided to shift the colony's agricultural efforts to Parramatta, known at that time as 'Rose Hill'.
 
In November 1788, Phillip sent a party of soldiers under Captain Campbell, accompanied by a convict labour force, to establish an agricultural settlement on the fertile land at the Crescent.
 
Land was cleared, to be used for growing crops and grazing, and a redoubt was built in the area (DPWS 1997: p. 15). Hopes for the long-term survival of the colony were pinned on the area. Major Robert Ross, the commandant of the marines, expressed the hopes of many when he wrote that from:
"... my having in company with the Governor viewed that part of the country they are going to, and my knowledge of Captain Campbell's attention and perseverance in forwarding everything that tends to the good of the public, flatters me with the hope that under his fostering hand, the scheme may succeed. But should the ground, unfortunately, not answer the intended purpose, I shall give up every hope of finding any place near as fit to form a settlement upon, much less the purpose of establishing a colony" (HRNSW 1978: P.198).
 
The Rose Hill settlement was laid out to a plan by William Dawes, a young and competent naval lieutenant with a knowledge of surveying. The colony's first effective town plan resulted in a design described as a classic 'Renaissance scheme' (Kass et al. 1996: p. 22). At the western end of this avenue, on the brow of the hill above the Redoubt, Phillip planned a small house for his own use which would close the western vista from the avenue. A second street (Church Street), running north south, crossed High Street. The vista through this Street was to be closed off by the planned church and Town Hall. On Church Street nine houses were built for unmarried women and several small huts for convict families of good character. Each hut was of wattle and daub construction with brick chimneys and thatched roofs. They had two rooms, one of which had a brick fireplace, and were designed to hold ten convicts. By March 1791 about 100 such huts had been completed (Kass et al. 1996: p. 24).
 
On the hill above the Crescent and facing down the length of High Street, the Governor's cottage was built using convict labour. Captain Watkin Tench described this residence as being ' long by ) wide, for the governor, on a ground floor only, with excellent out houses and appurtenances attached to it' (Tench 1979: pp. 224–5). The extensive garden setting of the building, as well as its prominent position, with a view over the township, gave some status to what was essentially a vernacular cottage. Although the governor's residence was somewhat larger, and had less occupants, it was similar in form to the vernacular cottages built to accommodate the convicts. From Tench's description it would appear that Governor Phillip's House at Rose Hill was largely constructed of materials which could be obtained locally, primarily timber, 'wattles' and clay or mud. The hip roof form was used for the earliest dwellings, with either a thatched, bark or shingle roof and timber rafters. Timber posts formed the structural framework, and a network of 'wattles' woven from Acacia branches was inserted between the posts and the gaps filled with mud. The walls were then plastered with pale coloured clay, which required constant renewal.
 
There are four images of the house in the 1790s. The  watercolour, View of Rose Hill, Port Jackson (artist unknown); two 1793 sketches by the Italian artist Fernando Brambila, the official artist to Alejandro Malaspina's Spanish expedition to the Americas, Micronesia, and New South Wales; and a 1798 engraving by James Heath which was published in David Collins' An Account of the English Colony in NSW (London 1798) (DPWS 1997: p. 17). The pattern of fenestration shown in these four etchings indicates that the house had two rooms with a central hall in a similar arrangement to the front central portion of the present house. Each of the two main rooms had a fireplace located on the rear wall. This arrangement of rooms would have provided a private bedroom for the Governor and a more public room in which guests could be received (DPWS 1997: p. 18). The central hall may have functioned as a waiting room. There was also a skillion at the rear (DPWS 1997: p. 18). While the construction of the Hunter cellars have destroyed a large part of the physical remains of the early dwelling, it is thought that brick flooring discovered during archaeological investigations under the north western section of the central part of today's house, dates back to Governor Phillip's original building (Proudfoot 1971: p. 5). By cross referencing these surviving archaeological remains with the building portrayed in the 1793 Brambila etchings, the Phillip building's position can be relatively accurately located. It stood on the same east west axis as the centre of the present house but the front wall was set back further to the west. The back wall of the Phillip house was also located further to the west than that of the subsequent Hunter house.
 
The 1790 lath and plaster house also had a small outbuilding at the rear. It would almost certainly have been constructed with similar 'wattle and daub' materials to the main house and, like it, would not have been entirely weatherproof. By the time Fernando Brambila sketched the settlement in April 1793 this original outbuilding had been replaced by two more substantial buildings, one almost as large as the house itself. The exact date of construction of these buildings is not known. No documentary evidence has been located referring to them, but given that Arthur Phillip left the colony in December 1792 and his successor, Francis Grose, was far less supportive of public works, a 1792 date seems probable (DPWS 1997: p. 19). The configuration of the buildings forming the Government House complex are the same in both Brambilla sketches. The northern outbuilding appears to be linked to the main house through the rear skillion while the southern outbuilding is detached. The brick footings of the northern building survive, at least in part. These bricks are of a different size and texture to those used later at Old Government House and support the theory that they form the footings for the Phillip outbuilding. The substantial brick footings also suggest a brick rather than a lath and plaster structure (DPWS 1997: p. 19). As depicted by Brambila the northern outbuilding is one and a half storeys high with an attic or loft, and it may have been a bedroom wing to allow the two principal rooms in the house to be used as reception rooms. The outbuilding on the southern side was one storey and completely detached. It may have been a kitchen removed from the house to lessen the risk of fire. A substantial brick drain survives under the floor of the Macquarie additions to the central block which may in the future provide clues as to the use of these early outbuildings (DPWS 1997: p. 19).
 
Even at this date, visitors were commenting favourably on the gardens surrounding the governor's house. The botanist of Alejandro Malaspina's expedition described the party's visit to Parramatta:
"They visited the new Government House, which stood on a hill at the end of the chief street.  In a beautiful garden surrounding it were a number of well grown fruit trees, such as pomegranates and apples, and nearly all of the vegetables known in Europe for culinary purposes. The different beds were edged with strawberries and two kinds of geraniums, the Geranium inquinans and zonale (pelargonium) and Cheiranthus Icanus (common stock) were all in full bloom.  The shoots of vines growing on the south side appeared to be healthy, and some bunches of grapes, which the Spanish party tasted in the Gardeners residence, were of excellent flavour. There were also melons and 'arbouses'(?) in great abundance" (translation from SMH 12 November 1910).

Governor Hunter (1795–1800)
When Phillip departed in late 1792, government of the Colony was placed in the hands of the commanding officer of the New South Wales Corps, Major Francis Grose. When Grose also returned to England due to ill health in December 1794, Captain William Paterson served as Lieutenant Governor until the arrival of Hunter in September 1795. There are few references to Old Government House during the period of their respective Lieutenant Governorships, and neither Grose nor Patterson appear to have made any substantive improvements or alterations to the Phillip-era buildings.
 
The colony was governed by Captain John Hunter from 1795 to 1800. He used Phillip's cottage until it became uninhabitable. By mid 1799, the house was regarded as being too small and the framing was so decayed that the roof fell in. It was condemned and a new residence for the governor was commenced, which was to be built of more permanent materials. Hunter was forced to hire labourers for essential work until the arrival of convict mechanics on the Barwell in mid-1798. The "Statement of work executed at the different settlements during the year 1799" which indicates the scope of public works undertaken at Parramatta by the different convict work groups, shows that carpenters and sawyers were allocated to the project, and that a party of convicts was also set to collecting and burning lime for the brickwork there (Rosen 2003: pp. 48–9). In April 1799, the brick foundations of the new house were laid, but the partially completed house was badly damaged in a fierce southerly storm in early June (DPWS 1997: p. 21). The extent of repairs would indicate that much of the damage was done by water, with the soft mortar being washed away and the floors and joinery swollen and twisted out of shape. The two storeyed single pile brick building contained reception rooms and bedrooms. The house was coated in roughcast and this original Hunter roughcast, or harling finish, survives intact on the two chimneys which were encased by Macquarie's extensions to the roof in the 1810s. Fragments of the clay roofing tiles from the Hunter house can also be seen embedded in these chimneys. The outbuildings of the original Phillip house were retained by Hunter and were probably used as a kitchen and for other uses related to the running of the house.

Governors King and Bligh, Foveaux and Patterson (1800–1809)

When Captain Phillip Gidley King arrived in New South Wales in April 1800 with orders for Hunter's recall to England, the new house at Parramatta was not quite ready, and by this time Government House in Sydney was uninhabitable (Rosen 2003: p. 51).
 
King handed over the government of the Colony to William Bligh in August 1806. After only seventeen months in office, in January 1808, the officers of the New South Wales Corps engineered his arrest. His successors also had brief tenures in office. Major George Johnston assumed the office of Lieutenant Governor following Bligh's arrest. Six months later he was replaced by Colonel Joseph Foveaux, who in turn was replaced in January 1809 by Lieutenant Governor William Paterson who remained in office until relieved by Macquarie (Proudfoot 1971: p. 24).
 
No work appears to have been done on the fabric of the Old Government House during this period. Comments made in respect to the property at this time, such as those of François Péron, the naturalist who accompanied the French expedition of Nicolas Baudin, relate to the 'Government Garden' which surrounded Old Government House. When King arrived in 1800 he was accompanied by the botanist George Caley, who had been sent to the Colony at the expense of Sir Joseph Banks to collect specimens of Australian flora for the Kew Gardens. King allowed Caley the use of the Government Domain at Parramatta, where he allocated him a 'botanical' garden under the direction of Lieutenant Governor William Paterson. Paterson himself was a member of the Royal Society and a keen botanist, who also collected plants for Banks and the Royal Gardens at Kew. Caley was to remain in the Colony for ten years, collecting vast numbers of indigenous plants and seeds, and sending descriptions and comments to Banks – including comments on the political situation in the Colony. Caley and Paterson used the gardens around Old Government House to experiment on the naturalisation of imported plants, and to establish collections of native species for transport to England. Péron, in his Voyage de Découvertes aux Terres Australes published in Paris between 1807 and 1816, remarks on the value of these gardens (quoted in Proudfoot 1971: p. 22).
"...here also are collected the most remarkable of the indigenous plants, intended to enrich the famous royal gardens at Kew.  It is from this spot that England has, at various times, acquired most of her treasures in the vegetable kingdom, which have enabled the English botanists to publish many important volumes".

Governor Macquarie (1810–1821)

Governor Macquarie planned improvements to both the township of Parramatta and to the Governor's residence there. By this time the ordered town layout planned by Phillip had been overlaid by buildings without regard to the original plan. On a visit in 1811 Macquarie laid out the town once more, in regular streets crossing at right angles. He ordered that no house should be built within the town before a plan of the house or building had been submitted through a Magistrate for approval by the Governor (Proudfoot 1971: p. 26).
 
He also determined that the grounds surrounding the governor's house at Parramatta should be reclaimed for use by the Governor, and made regulations restricting indiscriminate public entry (Proudfoot 1971: p. 26). It is from this time that the term "Domain" or "Demense" first came into use in reference to the Parramatta Government House and the government holdings associated with it. One reason for these restrictions on access to the Domain was that Macquarie had decided to enlarge Government House to accommodate himself and his family and staff. Initially the Macquaries rarely spent more than a day or two per month at Old Government House, as it could only accommodate the Governor and Lieutenant Governor and their wives. One of the out buildings may have been used to provide accommodation for the remainder of the party, alternatively they would have been accommodated at a local inn.

In addition, by 1812 the house was in poor condition. Richard Rouse was later to report to Commissioner John Bigge that the foundations of the centre part of the Hunter house were so decayed that a great part of the foundation had to be taken out and replaced with new brickwork and woodwork (Proudfoot 1971: p. 28). The ground floors had sunk, roofing shingles had rotted, and the outbuildings were in a complete state of decay (DPWS 1997: p. 24).
 
In 1812 and 1813 an attempt was made to rehabilitate the existing building. Convict carpenters and plasterers were assigned to the work, and the kitchen was replastered, window glass was replaced, a water closet was fitted, and new doors were made. In 1815 further additions were made to prop up the decaying house. It is thought that this also included the construction of a staircase at the rear of the Hunter house (DPWS 1997: p. 24). The scope of works necessitated the employment of six sawyers and nineteen plasterers, labourers, and carpenters, and lasted from May to June. One of the chief sources of grievance against Macquarie by the free settlers, was the scarcity of skilled convict labour caused by Macquarie's policy of retaining these skilled convicts for employment on public works, including the rebuilding of Old Government House. Commissioner Bigge noted in his "Report on the State of the Colony" that Macquarie was reluctant to disperse the skilled artisans, and that of the 11 767 male convicts who had arrived in the Colony between 1 January 1814 and 29 December 1820, some 4,587 were employed by the administration of which 1,587 were mechanics and 3,000 were labourers (Rosen 2003: p. 64).

Macquarie instructed his Aide-de-Camp, Lieutenant John Watts, to prepare plans to re-build and extend the house. Watts enjoyed the confidence of Elizabeth Macquarie, and in the new layout the vernacular house of Governor Hunter was transformed into an elegant Palladian style country house in the English manner. The Palladian symmetry of the new house was emphasised by the addition of two identical but mirror image side pavilions, connected by passageways to the main house. Watts also added the plinth, string course and portico to the front of the house. The whole structure was lined in plaster dressed to give it the appearance of ashlar. The zones of the house were clearly separated. The Macquaries occupied the northern pavilion, with the Breakfast Room probably being used as a private dining and drawing room. The servants occupied the southern pavilion and a rear building, separated by a yard. Sleeping accommodation for servants was provided in a separate building, and possibly also in a loft. The central portion of the house was used for receiving, entertaining and accommodating guests.
 
Between 24 March 1815 and 24 June 1815 the construction of the new house was the sole focus of Government public works at Parramatta, but evidence suggests that work began in fact in early 1815 (there is a gap in the Rouse returns for the first three months of this year as they have not survived). Six convict sawyers, six carpenters, four bricklayers, two plasterers, and seven labourers were engaged on construction during this period.
 
Although Lieutenant Watts was commissioned to design the additions to the house, the detailed design of the portico over the front door was undertaken by Francis Greenway. In August 1816 stone steps and a plinth were ordered together with four columns and four pilasters. A drawing by Watts of his portico design survives, but not the drawings by Greenway. Watts' design shows a portico with two pairs of Roman Doric columns and a plain frieze and fillet. As eventually constructed, Greenway elaborated the portico to include two sets of pillars with corresponding pilasters against the wall, and added a simplified Doric frieze with triglyphs and mutules. It is not known if the enlargement to the front door is contemporary with the addition of the portico, or if it was altered at a later date. The two elements appear to have been designed separately as the pilasters overlap the door. The French mariner, Louis de Freycinet, and his wife Rose de Freycinet, visited Parramatta and dined with the Macquaries. An engraving based on sketches prepared by Freycinet  shows the Greenway portico with the earlier form of door, so it is probable he saw it in its earlier configuration prior to alteration. This engraving also shows how the Macquaries had transformed the house and its setting in the image of an English gentleman's country residence.
 
Works were undertaken to improve the grounds. Macquarie recorded that stables and a coach-house were constructed in 1817, a fact confirmed by Greenway who claimed credit for their construction. A dove or pigeon house was added by 1820, and a rustic 'bark hut' designed by Mrs Macquarie was built on the top of the hill. No illustration of the bark hut has been found however the pigeon house can be seen in early 1820 views of Parramatta. The pigeon house was round, with a domed shingle roof. Another round building was located adjacent to it, but the use of this second structure is unknown. It was possibly either a fowl house or bath house. These two buildings did not survive for long and it appears they were removed to make way for the construction of the officers' quarters. The pigeon house may, however, have been relocated further south, as a colonnaded round structure with a similar lantern appears in later 1820s and 1830s views of the house. In 1831 the 'pigeon house' was used for accommodation, possibly for servants. No mention of the structure is made, however, in inventories later than the 1830s.
 
About 1818 another addition was made to the rear of the house which doubled the entire length of the original Hunter's residence. This provided more bedrooms upstairs and additional accommodation for the Governor downstairs. The roof was modified into a M shape, in cross section and may have had dormers in the back slope facing west.

The driving force behind the design for the extensions to house was probably Mrs Macquarie. She was familiar with architectural pattern books, bringing one with her to Australia. She had also been involved in the design and laying out of the grounds at her family home at Airds in Scotland. In the English and Scottish country houses with which she was familiar, the setting of the house was as important as the design of the house itself. As a result, the layout of the gardens was probably redesigned and supervised by Mrs Macquarie (DPWS 1997: p. 30). In the early years of the Colony, the Garden beds at Government House were necessary for the production of food. By Macquarie's time this was no longer the case, and the garden beds from the front of the house were removed and the house set in landscaped grounds with a series of pathways. The kitchen garden and orchard were re-established in an area located away from the main house. Mature native trees were retained and exotic species such as English oaks, elms, mulberries, pears and oranges were planted in the Domain.
 
The Macquaries used the house extensively between November 1816 and their return to England in 1822. Governor Macquarie sometimes left his wife and child there while he toured the colony, and in November 1820 whilst he was away, the house was badly damaged by a lightning strike. No physical evidence of the damage survives, but contemporary descriptions indicate that considerable repairs to the building were required on both the upper and lower levels.

The Bigge inquiry necessitated a complete inventory of Macquarie's building activities, and gives an indication of the use of the various rooms in Old Government House during his tenure. The northern pavilion comprised the Governor's private apartments, and contained the breakfast room with French doors opening out to a bower to the north. The pavilion also contained the bedroom used by the Governor, a dressing room and lobby. The bedroom was also used for gatherings as it contained eleven chairs. This was typical of a late eighteenth century interior when the best bed chamber was second only in status to the best parlour and was used for entertaining as well as sleeping. Although all of the p1ans show the passage between the northern pavilion and the central block as enclosed it was termed a 'colonnade', and contained no furniture. The lack of furniture may also indicate that it was originally external, as in the 1850s there are references to three stone columns on the southern side of the passageway. It is thought that there may have been a private entrance to the northern pavilion from the front garden through the colonnade as there was a porch or awning in this location by the mid-1850s, indicating a door. The middle hall was used as a seating area, with six adults chairs, one child's chair and a stool for a servant. This area, like the main hall, may have been used by people waiting to see the Governor. Alternatively it was used for meeting larger groups than could be accommodated in his adjacent office. The butler's pantry was located immediately off the hall. Like the middle hall the front hall also contained chairs for waiting visitors. The two front rooms were used as a dining room and a drawing room. The dining room was originally the furthest from the kitchen, but in the twentieth century this arrangement was reversed. It is not known which room the earlier governors used as a dining room (DPWS 1997: pp. 36–7).

The upstairs rooms were used as bed rooms and dressing rooms. By 1821 the water closet was located adjacent to the staircase. The servant's loft was located between the water closet and room 7, which is thought to be the room of Macquarie's aide-de-camp, Sgt Whalan, and accessed from the southern colonnade. This servant's loft may have been in the back half of the roof of the main portion of the house accessed via a very narrow, steep staircase. No evidence of this configuration occurs on the plan however dormer windows occurred in this location. The alternate view is that the dormers may have lit the central corridor (DPWS 1997: pp. 36–7).
 
In the southern wing at the back of the house, two of the rooms were reserved for larders. One was the kitchen proper and the other the scullery. The laundry was in a separate building (DPWS 1997: p. 37).

George Salter had built a cottage on the River bank on the reach running north away from the Crescent between 1798 and 1805, and grew wheat and maize. Part of Salter's holding was purchased by Governor Macquarie in 1813 in move towards consolidating the Domain land. Up until the 1820s the Domain was a convict working property containing the Lumber Yard and up to ninety convicts working in quarrying, milling, blacksmithing, farming and gardening. Later, the Domain area was further increased with purchase of other properties. A small farm house built by George Salter in 1798–1806 was acquired and extended by Governor Lachlan Maquarie in 1816 for use as a dairy. This building is now called Dairy Cottage and has a heritage listing.

Governor Brisbane (1821–1825)
Lachlan Macquarie's successor Governor Brisbane preferred to reside at Government House at Parramatta rather than Government House in Sydney. His preference for Parramatta was probably not due to the attributes of the house or its extensive grounds, but that the domain provided an excellent site for his private observatory.
 
The Observatory, erected in 1822 was part of Brisbane's intention to make Parramatta "the Greenwich of the Southern Hemisphere" (DPWS 1997: p. 39). Brisbane was accompanied to Australia by two astronomers: Charles Rumker, who had already attained a good reputation as an astronomer and mathematician; and James Dunlop, whose great natural ability in mechanical appliances and instruments saw him identified as a suitable man for second assistant in the Observatory in an out of the way place like Parramatta. On arrival in New South Wales, Brisbane's instruments were immediately set up on piers in the Domain to allow the observation of the solstice on 21 December 1821. By April 1822, the construction of the observatory had been completed in anticipation of the appearance of Encke's Comet, an event not observable in Europe or at the Cape of Good Hope (Rosen 2003: p. 80). The observatory was privately funded by Brisbane and consisted of two buildings: an observatory equipped at Brisbane's personal expense; and a residence attached to it. On the north and south sides were five windows, three of which were in a semi-circular projection from the wall at the base of the domes. Transit openings in the domes extended to one of the windows to allow observations of the horizon. A  Georg Friedrich von Reichenbach repeating circle was located under the north dome and a  equatorial Banks telescope was under the south dome. There was also an Edward Troughton mural circle and a  Troughton transit instrument. A Hardy clock showed sidereal time and an Abraham-Louis Breguet clock showed mean time. All instruments were mounted on solid masonry piers. There was also a Jean Nicolas Fortin pendulum and two instruments for observing the dip and variation of the magnetic needle. Some £470 was spent on the building in 1832, when the house was extended by two small rooms. In 1835, the transit was replaced by a  Jones' transit circle, after which the mural circle was predominantly used because Dunlop believed the Jones circle was too difficult for one person to operate (Rosen 2003: pp. 86–87).

Although comprehensive plans of the Observatory remain the building has largely vanished, with only the stone piers surviving. These piers are now the sole remnants of the astronomical activities that occurred at Parramatta; however, another substantial legacy remains. In 1824, at the instigation of the Royal Society, the measurement of an arc of the meridian of New South Wales through Parramatta was ordered by Earl Bathurst. The arc would provide data 'for determining correctly the figure of the Earth ... [and] be useful in laying a foundation for a correct Survey of our Colonies'. In 1828, when Thomas Mitchell began the first trigonometrical survey of New South Wales, his initial meridian was taken from the Parramatta transit instrument in consultation with Dunlop. That survey underpinned mapping in New South Wales until recent times (Rosen 2003: p. 80). Surveyor Edward Ebbsworth, when conducting his 1887 survey of Parramatta Park, ensured that the exact location of the piers would be preserved by fixing a copper plug in the basal stone of the piers. The Observatory functioned from 1822, the year of its construction until 1829 when Rumker returned to Europe. In 1831 Dunlop, who had retired to take up farming was appointed superintendent, repairs were undertaken and the observatory operated again, until its closure in 1847, when the astronomical equipment was removed to Sydney and eventually installed in the new Sydney Observatory built on Flagstaff (later Observatory) Hill (DPWS 1997: p. 39; Rosen 2003; p. 81).
 
The work of Brisbane and his associated astronomers were the first scientific astronomical observations, and amongst the first scientific experimental work, to come from Australia (the French had conducted experiments into magnetic declination in the southern hemisphere at Recherche Bay in 1791). Rumker's publication of his observations of Encke's Comet resulted in him being awarded a silver medal and £100 by the Royal Astronomical Society and a gold medal from the Institut de France. In 1826, Rumker also discovered a new comet in the constellation of Orion. Rumker's chief publication resulting from his work at Parramatta, the Preliminary Catalogue of Fixed Stars, Intended for a Prospectus of a Catalogue of the Stars of the Southern Hemisphere, Included within the Tropic of Capricorn; Now Reducing from the Observations, Made in the Observatory at Parramatta by Charles Rumker, Hamburg, appeared in 1832. Dunlop on the other hand published his observations on the length of a seconds pendulum in the Philosophical Transactions of the Royal Society in 1823, and his observations of nebulae of the southern hemisphere in 1828. For this latter work, he received a gold medal from the Royal Astronomical Society. He also published, in 1829, a life of double stars observed from the Parramatta Observatory in the Memoirs of the Astronomical Society. Governor Brisbane's own monumental work, A Catalogue of 7385 Stars, Chiefly in the Southern Hemisphere, published in 1835 by the Admiralty, was regarded by the European scientific community a major scientific achievement (Rosen 2003: pp. 80–81). It was in recognition of his patronage of astronomy in NSW, and for the abundance of observations that came pouring in from Parramatta, that in 1828 the Royal Astronomical Society awarded him the gold medal for the Parramatta Catalogue of Stars and General Observations, printed by the Royal Society in their Transactions. Sir John Herschel, at that time President of the Astronomical Society, said, in presenting the medal:
"We give this medal accompanied with the strongest expressions of our admiration for your patriotic and princely support given to Astronomy in regions so remote.  It will be to you a source of honest pride as long as you live to reflect that the most brilliant trait of Australian history marks the era of your government, and that your name will be identified with the future glories of that colony in ages yet to come, as the founder of her science.  It is a distinction worthy of a British Governor.  Our first triumphs in those fair climes have been the peaceful ones of science, and the treasures they have transmitted to us are imperishable records of useful knowledge, speedily to be returned with interest, to the improvement of their condition and their elevation in the scale of nations" (BoM: 2001).
 
Associated with Brisbane's transit stones are two marker trees which stand to the south of the transit stones. These are Pinus roxburghii (tortoise shell pines), the same species used as marker trees at Brisbane's Makerstoun observatory in Scotland. Two more marker trees were located near the southern Domain gatehouse, spaced at an identical distance as those at the observatory, on the same north–south alignment extending through the transit stones. These original marker trees are now more than 180 years old (Rosen 2003: p. 89).
 
Brisbane continued to maintain the Macquarie's garden and the domain pastures. He was also concerned with horticultural improvements, planting clover and rye in 1824 and irrigating the gardens using a 'garden engine'. One hundred garden pots were also purchased for a 'Botanical and Horticultural establishment' (Rosen 2003: pp. 83–4). Brisbane encouraged botanical experimentation at Parramatta as well as astronomy. He conducted largely unsuccessful experiments in growing Virginian tobacco, Georgian cotton, Brazilian coffee and New Zealand flax. Imported grasses were planted to improve the quality of the pasture. Lady Brisbane continued the planting of the park begun by Mrs Macquarie (DPWS 1997: p. 39).
 
During 1823 a series of minor repairs were undertaken at Old Government House, under the supervision of the recently appointed Civil Architect, Standish Lawrence Harris. A door was added and a brick chimney constructed (the location of both of which are now unknown). Repairs to brick work and the shingles were undertaken and stone flagging laid.
 
Harris also designed a Bath House for the Governor, which had its own reticulated water supply and which continues to exist albeit in a much altered form (DPWS 1997: p. 40). In 1847 a journalist noted that the bath was in the centre of the building and was furnished with a shower bath. An adjoining room was fitted with apparatus for generating steam and a third was adapted for heating water (DPWS 1997: p. 40). Each of the rooms was ornamented with a handsome cornice. The Bath House was supplied with water from the Parramatta River by way of a forcing pump. It appears that the main house may also have been connected to the pump. In 1972, a report in the Parramatta Advertiser claimed that the water was pumped from the river in the vicinity of today's amphitheatre and flowed away via a brick drain to a duck pond near where the bowling club now stands (Rosen 2003: p. 84). In 1886 the Bath House was substantially altered and converted into a park pavilion (DPWS 1997: p. 40).
 
The Garrison Building, or Officers Quarters as it was more commonly known, appears at this time. The officers quarters are not mentioned on Antill's 1821 inventory, indicating that they were probably constructed for Governor Brisbane in early 1822. The building consists of two wings, one room deep, separated by a passage. The walls are of varying thicknesses and alignments, indicating that the building was built in stages. It may have incorporated earlier outbuildings, possibly those constructed for servants accommodation between 1815 and 1816, as part of the Macquaries improvements to the house. The building was constructed to provide additional accommodation for the officers who formed the Governor's staff and for household servants. The four rooms for the officers faced the rear courtyard of the house. Lycett's 1824 aquatint, although somewhat inaccurate in its depiction of the main house, shows a rear block with no verandah connected to the main house via a covered way. The arrangement of windows pictured matches that of the south east corner of the Garrison Building (DPWS 1997: p. 41). The round structure in the centre of the image may be the old pigeon house with an added colonnade. The Officers Quarters had by 1838 a long verandah running north south across the front of the building. A photograph of the rear of the building taken in 1908 shows a rear verandah, its roof integral with the back slope of the roof. The west wing which accommodated the servants did not have a verandah. It opened into a separate yard behind the officers quarters. Two of the rooms are larger, with sandstone fireplaces. One of these was probably the servant's dining room. The dining room may have been the room located in the south east corner, closest to the kitchen wing of the main house. A covered way, connecting the back suite of buildings with the kitchen block, is indicated on the 1857 site plan. It is also described by Lady Franklin and shown in Lycett's engraving.

Governor Darling (1825–1831)
Darling's military governorship of the formerly French Mauritius between 1819 and 1823 was poor preparation for his post in New South Wales, where he was confronted by a free colonial society that was increasingly intolerant of the constraints of a penal colony. He set about reforming the administration of the colony and demanded that officials conduct themselves respectably. Darling's military bearing and attitudes were resented, and conflict with the newly instigated Executive Council and with the judiciary marred a hard-working administration that, at last, integrated the civil service and reformed the monetary and banking system (Rosen 2003: p. 91).
 
When Darling arrived, Government House Sydney was in a poor condition, having been uninhabited for four years. Darling described the Sydney house as 'a perfect Hovel' and, after initially staying in the house of the Chief Justice, he took up residence at Parramatta while the Sydney house was renovated. Government House Parramatta was described at the time by the artist Joseph Lycett as combining 'all the requisites of a rural residence, with the convenience of being at only a short distance from Sydney'. While the Darlings were cognisant of the attractions of Parramatta, the Governor was determined that he would not repeat Brisbane's mistake of isolating himself there. Sydney again became the principal residence of the Governor, while Parramatta served as a winter retreat and a haven when repairs were being undertaken at Sydney (Rosen 2003: p. 91).
 
Governor Darling had little impact on the fabric of Old Government House. An inventory survives which provides evidence of how the house was used in 1831. The dining room remained in the same position, however, the larger Breakfast room was now used as a Drawing Room, with the Governor's Office and a small office adjacent. The private secretary also had an office in the house. Only two of the servants are accommodated in the main building, the remainder are accommodated in the separate servants quarters at the back of the Garrison Building. The servants hall is also now located in the separate servants quarters (DPWS 1997: p. 42).
 
In 1828, the British Treasury considered the expense of furnishing the various colonial government houses. The decision was taken that inventories of furniture should be made, and that the Governor was to be made responsible for any deficiencies. In the future, both building maintenance and furniture costs would be borne by the NSW Colonial Treasury. This policy shift marks the beginning of the decline of Government House Parramatta. Over the next decade, the saga of the construction of the Sydney Government House dragged on, and Government House Parramatta languished as its future as a viceregal residence waned. In August 1829, after Darling received an estimate for additions to the stables, it was decided not to proceed with the work, and hostility between successive Governors and the NSW Executive Council resulted in the Colonial Treasury becoming uninterested in providing the 'indulgence' of two houses for the Governor (Rosen 2003: p. 94).

Governor Bourke (1831–1837)
Governor Bourke preferred Parramatta, and initially chose to live in the house as he thought the climate might be beneficial to his wife's health. His wife died in the house in May 1832, probably of rheumatic carditis. In addition to the Governor and his wife, two of his sons formed part of his household. The eldest son John was blind and the younger son, Richard, acted as the Governor's private secretary from 1831 until 1834. The Bourkes appear to have altered the room usage, with the former drawing room being converted into a bedroom, possibly for their blind son or Mrs Bourke. The door to the rear passage was probably added to enable the room to be entered without passing through the hall where visitors might possibly be waiting. The breakfast room was used as a drawing room (DPWS 1997: p. 44). The gardens continued to be maintained. The servants were for the most part accommodated in the back suite of buildings, as were the officers of the Governor's staff.
 
Despite the death of his wife there, Parramatta was known to be Bourke's favourite residence. He made good use of the Domain, taking daily walks or riding and, while he resided in Sydney when required, he worked as much as possible at Parramatta and escaped there on the weekends (Rosen 2003: p. 99). Bourke and subsequent governors continued to use Old Government House, however once the decision was made in 1832 to build a new Government House in Sydney it became difficult for the Governor's to obtain funding to maintain the house at Parramatta. Lord Viscount Goderich, in a despatch to Bourke gave instructions regarding the disposal of Old Government House. Bourke pleaded for the retention of the house:
'Were your Lordship fully acquainted with the endless labor and detail and the personal importunity attending the administration of this Government, and the expense consequent upon a constant residence in Sydney, I am convinced you would not hesitate to allow the Governor the partial rest from fatigue, and needful economy of money, which the occasional retirement to the country affords him.  I believe I am correct in stating that neither the Council nor the public seem to call for the surrender of the Parramatta house' (Rosen 2003: p.99).
The correspondence continued for years and the matter was not finally resolved until the 1850s when the house was let (DPWS 1997: p. 43).
 
Minor maintenance work, mainly plastering, repainting and reshingling, continued to be done on the main house and outbuildings. Reflecting changes in the convict system, the Department of the Colonial Architect would supply plans and specifications for work which was to be undertaken, largely by contractors under supervision by the department. With only a small number of mechanics retained for minor works, a shortage of skilled labour and high wages meant that the cost of repairs attracted the criticism of both the NSW Executive Council and the Colonial Treasury. Unskilled convict labourers continued to be supplied by the Assignment Board, and in July 1833 a shepherd and a labourer were allocated to the Domain (Rosen 2003: p. 100). The only new construction approved during the period of Bourke's governorship were additions to the Guardhouse approved in 1835 at a cost of £97 (Rosen 2003: pp. 100, 102).

Governor Gipps (1838–1846)
Governor Gipps corresponded with Lord Stanley regarding the continuing use of the house. Stanley agreed that the Governor could retain Old Government House provided that the expenses associated with the running and maintenance of the house were paid for by the Governor, and not from the public purse. Gipps decided in late 1845 that he did not wish to use house and advertised it for lease in a series of lots. He was unwell, having a heart condition that made even climbing the staircase difficult (DPWS 1997: p. 45). He may have wished to lease Old Government House because of the considerable energy required to maintain two households. The property was to be let in two lots. The second lot comprised the remainder of the land of the Governor's Domain, but without the stone quarries (DPWS 1997: p. 46). It does not appear, however, that the house was leased for long, probably less than a year.

Governor Fitzroy (1846–1855)

The new Governor, Charles Augustus Fitzroy, began his term in August 1846 and used the house frequently. Like the other Governors before him, Governor Fitzroy restricted public access to the Domain, reserving it for his own use, with tragic consequences. His wife, the Hon. Lady Mary Fitzroy, and his Aide-de-Camp, Lieutenant Masters, were killed in a carriage accident in December 1847 as they started out on a journey to St James' Church, Sydney to attend a wedding, when the Governor was driving the carriage (DPWS 1997: p. 47). The Governor did not visit the house much following her death, and it is believed that he had the house boarded up (DPWS 1997: p. 47).
 
In 1850 the Colonial Architect requested an inspection of the house. As a result of the inspection, almost all areas of the house were found to require repair and renovation. An extensive white ant problem was identified particularly in the shingle roof, and a large nest was discovered in the ceiling over the Governor's bedroom. As a result, extensive work was required to a number of the ceilings in the buildings (DPWS 1997: pp. 47–8).
 
The list of recommended repairs indicates that the level of finishes varied from room to room, with colouring undertaken in rooms such as the governor's rooms, whereas those occupied by servants, such as the kitchen, housekeepers room, and the housemaids room were limewashed. The inspection report also noted that the public rooms were generally papered and that this was protected during the works (DPWS 1997: p. 50). The extent of work actually undertaken is not known, however the reports regarding the condition of the building made five years later indicate that the white ant problem was not solved (DPWS 1997: p. 50).
 
In 1852 the external wood work of the house was repainted by James Houison (DPWS 1997: p. 50). The works were to be undertaken to the satisfaction of the colonial architect, Samuel Elyard, who noted the colours on a sketch of the house drawn in the early 1870s, as being: grey-green shutters in a light tone, but deeper than the tone of the house; all building walls in a strong yellow ochre; light warm grey roofs; light green shades in the front of the main building, with others dark green (DPWS 1997: p. 51).
 
In early 1855 the Colonial Architect investigated the condition of the house again, and reported that the house was in such a decayed state that it was useless to attempt to repair it. The ravages of the white ants with which it was infested had more or less destroyed the whole of the timberwork in the building. The roof and the floors were for the most part rotten. The insect infestation appeared to be so extensive throughout the house that in the opinion of the Colonial Architect if any repairs were made the new work would soon become as bad as the old. He advised the Governor that the premises would require a considerable outlay to make them habitable, and felt that he could not recommend to the Governor incurring such expense upon such a dilapidated building (DPWS 1997: p. 51).

Governor Denison et al. 1855–
Governor Denison did not wish to fund repairs to the house, and accordingly he leased in 1856 to James Byrnes and John Richard Harding. An argument resulted between the Governor and the NSW Legislative Council as to the income from the lease of the domain. The Legislature felt that it was public money, whereas the Governor was of the opinion that the domain had been set aside for the use of the Governors of NSW. Denison recommended, however, that the income should be spent on the repair of the boundary fence (which had been damaged by fire) and the buildings (DPWS 1997: p. 51). However, no expenditure on the house appears to have taken place at this time.
 
The New South Wales Legislative Council eventually passed an Act in March 1857, to allow for the disposal of the surplus domain lands and for the creation of Parramatta Park (DPWS 1997: p. 52). The legislation allowed for the establishment of the Park however no provision was made for the upkeep of the house or its extensive gardens. The surviving buildings were leased (DPWS 1997: p. 52). In the late 1850s the extent of the park was further reduced by the construction of the western railway line. The line from Parramatta was extended to Blacktown and a cutting required at Rose Hill. As a result, the stables and the Fitzroy's dog kennels were demolished as they were in the path of the new railway line (DPWS 1997: p. 52).
 
From the mid-1850s until after the turn of the century the house was leased. Very few details of the occupants are known, but between 1865 and 1877 the house was tenanted by Andrew Blake. From 1878 a Mrs Abrahams ran a boarding house, entitled the 'Government House Boarding Establishment.' From 1885 to 1895 D. J. Bishop was proprietor and erected some buildings in the course of his tenure. Mrs. Abrahams again leased the property in 1897 and the 'present tennant' was given a week's notice to quit. But after struggling to pay the rent across 1899, in early 1900 she was forced to give up the enterprise. From 1901 to 1905 a Mr Drummond operated St. John's Preparatory School there.
 
Although the house remained in the ownership of the Government, under the management of the Parramatta Park Trust, between 1888 and 1908, there is little record of any expenditure on the house during this time. The roof was replaced with corrugated iron  and the Garrison Building repaired after being damaged by fire. By 1908 the house was in poor condition. Large sections of the external render were missing from the front and the rear, the eaves had dropped, and Lady Gipps' Bower had collapsed (DPWS 1997: p. 55).

The Park Gatehouses
The gatehouses date from the 1870s and represent an intact collection of park accommodation structures. Four of the gatehouses have been conserved. The style of the gatehouses reflects their strategic location, ranging from the grand entrances of the Tudor-style George St gatehouse and the Gothic-style Macquarie St Gatehouse, to the humble utilitarian entrances. The George St Gatehouse is a key entry point for the Park and an iconic landmark in Parramatta. It was built by the Parramatta Park Trust in 1885, on the site of Governor Macquarie's small stone lodge. The architect was Scottish born Gordon McKinnon and it was built by local builders Hart and Lavors. The wrought iron gates were made by local blacksmith T. Forsyth. Individually and as a group the gatehouses demonstrate English cultural references and concepts of nineteenth century park landscape enhancement and utility.

The Boer War Memorial
The Boer War Memorial which was erected in 1904 is one of comparatively few memorials to the Boer War throughout Australia. This particular example is an important one, as the first of the Australian troops to arrive in Africa in 1899 to take part in the Boer War came from the Lancer Barracks, Parramatta. The detachment of the NSW Lancers returning to Australia from England, was the first Australian Colonial force to land in South Africa for the Anglo-Boer War. The Lancers were soon joined in the early operations by the first Australian Regiment (formed from most of the Australian colonies). 100 Lancers from the surrounding districts took part in engagements which inspired Banjo Paterson to write a poem celebrating the pride with which the Lancers represented their country:

And out in front the Lancers rode that New South Wales had sent. 
With easy stride across the plains the long lean 'Walers' went;
 Unknown, untried these squadrons were, but proudly out they drew.
Beside the British regiments that fought at Waterloo

The Boer War was the first overseas military engagement in which troops representing Australia, as distinct from Britain, took part. The Memorial incorporates four Doric columns, together with entablature blocks and cornices which were recycled from the Parramatta Courthouse built by Mortimer Lewis in 1837. The gun on top of the memorial was one of six nine pound field guns purchased by New South Wales in 1856, and was originally intended to be part of the defence of Port Jackson. The memorial was constructed in 1904 and unveiled by Sir Austin Chapman, Federal Minister for Defence in the first Deakin government 1903–1904.

The King's School
A major program of restoration works was undertaken in 1909 under the supervision of the Government Architect, Walter Liberty Vernon. A measured drawing of Old Government House undertaken  shows the layout of the house before the conversion to a school. This plan, which shows a layout largely unmodified since 1855, shows the open configuration of verandah to the northern corridor between the main building and the northern pavilion (DPWS 1997: pp. 55–6). There are no verandahs to the pavilions themselves, as these were added in 1909. The configuration of the kitchen as shown on the drawings is the reverse of the Watts plan and appears to indicate that the bread oven, shown on Watts plans, had not been constructed. This is confirmed by the 1821 inventory which describes the room as a scullery, not a bakehouse (DPWS 1997: p. 56).
 
The King's School is the oldest independent school in Australia and was founded in a very real sense at the Battle of Waterloo, where the Duke of Wellington's success in defeating Napoleon led to a wave of popularity that swept him into office as the Prime Minister of Great Britain. There the Duke was able to exercise his preferment in appointments to significant positions. This resulted in him despatching his protégé, Archdeacon William Broughton, to Australia to introduce a "superior description" of education into New South Wales. Started by Broughton in 1831, the King's School became the most significant school for young gentlemen of its time and the site of the first quality education in the colony (King's School 2006). The first intake of boys to the school was to produce a President of the Queensland Legislative Council, a Speaker of the Queensland Legislative Assembly, a Mayor and several other State politicians, clergymen, a police magistrate, graziers and the first Australian Methodist missionary. The school has provided education to princes and entertained members of the British Royal Family on several occasions. The King of Malaysia sent his three sons to the School in 1965, and the Royal family of Thailand also sent the Crown Prince of Thailand to King's in 1970 (King's School 2006).
 
The drawings held in the PWD Plan Room show the extent of works proposed and the new layout on conversion to the school. The configuration of the central portion of the house was largely retained intact. Upstairs the volume of the stairhall was reduced and a WC added. The former WC had been converted into a bath room by this stage. On the first floor were located two dormitories, the married masters room, the matron's room, the sick room, the bathroom and WC. In the central portion of the house, on the ground floor, were located the Dining Room (south room) and the school hall (north room), two class rooms (north and south west rooms) and the masters sitting room. In the northern pavilion were located two dormitories and the master's room. An ablutions block was added to the rear of the north pavilion, containing showers, wash basins, WC's and urinals. To create this addition, the form of the pavilion was continued outwards and contained showers and wash basins. The toilets were in a smaller addition separated by a tar paved path. A new entrance to the northern passage was created from the rear yard. It allowed access through a lobby to the 'new' bedroom as well as to the northern passageway. The rear yard was partially tar paved. A new entrance to the cellar was created, where the steps to the French doors had previously been located. The French doors were removed. As part of the restoration, the Officers Quarters were converted to provide accommodation for the Masters and the laundress. The Officers bedrooms were used by the masters and a new lobby and bathroom added to the rear, accessed from a common room. Two rooms in the southern wing were converted into a laundry, with new coppers and tubs. The south western end of the building was substantially demolished (DPWS 1997: pp. 59–61).

The National Trust
In 1967 an Act of Parliament was created to allow the National Trust to take over the management of the house (DPWS 1997: p. 62). A program of restoration works were undertaken between 1968 and 1970 aimed at returning the house to the configuration that was used by Macquarie based on the plans of Lieutenant Watts (DPWS 1997: p. 62). A number of the alterations undertaken for the King's School were removed. The servants bedrooms were removed and the kitchen returned to its original location. A bread oven was salvaged from a bakery in Parramatta and installed in the kitchen. As no evidence of the nineteenth century layout of the kitchen survived in the room, the layout was based on the Watts plans (DPWS 1997: p. 62). During the 1990s the National Trust removed a number of the earlier modifications, including many of the outbuildings. Despite the use of the Watts plans, the house both internally and externally is somewhat different in detail to its appearance in 1816. Many of the elements have been replaced once, twice or even three times. Although in most rooms the volumes are still intact, the majority of the fabric that is immediately visible is not the original nineteenth century fabric, but is twentieth century 'restoration' (DPWS 1997: p. 63).
 
The approach of the Trust has been to present the ground floor largely as it was used by the Macquaries, with the exception of the Governors Office (DPWS 1997: p. 64). Very few of the service areas are presented to the public. Work has been undertaken in the Macquaries' drawing room to present the room as it would have appeared based on the early inventories (DPWS 1997: p. 64).
 
The garden was also modified to a layout based on nineteenth century landscaping principles by Loudon and a local nurseryman, Thomas Shepard. Some time later it was discovered that the layout that was removed, was in fact an early layout of the carriage loop that had survived intact until the 1850s when it was mapped during the preparation of surveys for the new rail line (DPWS 1997: p. 63). The garden remains in its altered configuration. The grounds, which were considered by early visitors to be far superior to the house, currently provide little evidence of the landscaped setting intended and created by the Macquaries (DPWS 1997: p. 63).

Description

The area contains over eighty items of cultural significance. These items include: buildings (such as Old Government House), relics (former observatory), historic plantings, archaeological sites (41 in all, including former roads, convict huts, stables, redoubt, lumberyard), vistas (across Parramatta and along George St to the former wharf) and natural items such as bushland. Evidence of Aboriginal use of this area includes stone artefacts and scarred trees (Rosen, S. 2003).

Within the boundary of the place, the layout of the major elements of the park retains much of the Governor Macquarie usage of the space. Existing roads for the most part follow the original carriage ways. The generally open Cumberland Plain Woodlands survive in patches in the Park, with much of the open landscape of the broader Governor's Domain, which reflect Elizabeth Macquarie's design principles, still evident in the Park as it exists today. The 'Crescent', the natural amphitheatre which attracted Governor Phillip to the area – influencing the decision to establish the farm there, is evident today and used as an outdoor amphitheatre and performance space.
 
The astronomical work of Governor Brisbane at the site can still be seen in the remains of the observatory and the marker trees, and represents the commencement of Australian scientific endeavour and the start of a process during which Australia developed a world renowned reputation for scientific research and discovery.
 
The road ways and their layouts reflect the natural topography of the area including the River Road which follows the course of the Parramatta River and their alignments have remained substantially unchanged since the 1880s. The roads are likely to have beneath them substantial remains of older road surfaces, culverts and retaining walls. The roadways within the Park also have a park-land ambience which separate them from the busy roads surrounding the Park. River Road is a particularly pleasant and evocative tree-lined avenue.
 
Old Government House at Parramatta was built by convicts and is the oldest surviving public building on the Australian mainland. The original 1799 building was enlarged in 1815 to a design by John Watts to form a two-storey block, two single storey end pavilions and two linked blocks with extended eaves. The central portico is attributed to Francis Greenway (Irving 1985: 55). With its symmetrical proportions, shadow patterns from extended eaves and central portico it exhibits the 'Palladian' characteristics of Australian Old Colonial Georgian architecture. A section of the brick flooring of the Phillip era, of July 1790, survives and is on display. The three rooms at the front of the main section of the house date to Governor Hunter in 1799, while the remainder of the main house and the two side pavilions date to Governor Macquarie in 1818.

The Governor's dairy survives in its original setting, and has recently been stabilised and restored by the Park Trust. The park landscape and use has continued since 1857. Memorials have been erected reflecting layers of community meaning. Important amongst these is the Boer War Memorial erected in 1904 which continues as a major landmark feature of the place. The Boer War Memorial, the memorial to Lady Mary Fitzroy, and the gatehouses remain in their original sites and are in good condition. Other elements, however, have been subjected to substantial change over the decades. The Macquarie stables and coachhouse were removed when the Great Western Railway line was pushed through the south-western section of the Domain. Little remains of Governor Brisbane's observatory with the exception of the transit stones and the marker trees. Similarly, Governor Brisbane's bathhouse, although still in its original site, has undergone extensive alteration. The original interior has been stripped out, the fabric within the arches removed, and the building turned into an open pavilion.

Precincts

Old Government House precinct

This precinct surrounds the building complex of Old Government House, including its garden to the east and north, rear courtyard to the west, range of outbuildings west of that and further rear yard / courtyard beyond that. Old Government House's garden and grounds are richly planted.

The Crescent Precinct
This comprises "The Crescent", a billabong landform of an old anabranch of the Parramatta River, which, with its rich deposited river silt and loam, has long been a centre of Government cultivation in the colony, helping feed its near-starving early inhabitants. Successful cultivation of cereal crops, grapes (some of Australia's earliest) and other crops here literally fed the colony after 1788 and crop failures and erratic ship arrivals. Later in the twentieth century the Crescent was in-filled and has taken on more of a passive recreation focus, for outdoor concerts and events.
The ridgeline along Constitution Hill wrapping west of the Crescent's rim has been revegetated in native trees, shrubs and grasses since the mid-1990s to strengthen the biodiversity values and viability of remnant eucalypt trees here.

The Paddocks Precinct
This comprises the paddocks west of Constitution Hill and the Dairy/Salter's Cottage precinct. This comprises farm paddock elements remaining from the Government Domain, which once extended further west (all of what is today Westmead – being West Meadow) and Northmead (North Meadow). Today these are primarily grassed for passive recreation with playground equipment, picnic and other facilities scattered around.

The Dairy/Salter's Cottage Precinct
This comprises some of the earliest building complexes in the park lands, and remnants of early land grants to private farmers of the Government Domain. It is fenced off from the surroundings and interpreted for its historic uses with a modest garden and small representative orchard, sculpture, interpretation and guided tours.

Other buildings and features

George Street Gatehouse

The first gatehouse in this location was a stone lodge built by Governor Macquarie in 1820. Macquarie extended the then Government /Governor's Domain out (east) two blocks to O'Connell Street (formerly it had come up to Pitt Street/Row, far closer to Old Government House. He added a stone gate lodge.

In 1885 a two-storey brick Tudor Revival pattern book gate house replaced the first gate lodge which was demolished. Architect Gordon McKinnon designed the new gate house, local builders Hart & Lavor were paid £590 to build it, with local blacksmith T. Forsyth crafting its wrought iron gates. The lodge is identical to another built on a pastoral property in the Western District of Victoria. Historically the gatehouse keeper's wife provided picnickers in the park with hot water for tea.

Matilda and Samuel Case are believed to be the first residents of the "Tudor" Gatehouse, in 1885. In 1901 Gertrude and Lewis Taylor lived there with son Keith, born in the upstairs bedroom the following year. Also in 1902 William Entwhistle moved from the Mays Hill gatehouse to the George Street gatehouse. In the late 1930s Florence and Percy Wyles kept a small zoo, cared for the horses and ran a small shop in the lobby of the gatehouse. Until 1951 Joseph Rose's family lived there while the United States Army occupied Parramatta Park (Willoughby, 2013, citing Chris Rapp, "The History of a Gate House: the story of a Parramatta Park Entrance").

Mays Hill Gatehouse
This single storey cottage faces the Great Western Road, now the Great Western Highway.

Observatory Site
Governor Thomas Brisbane's Observatory site includes two transit stones, two marker trees (Himalayan or chir pine, Pinus roxburghii) to its south, two more chir pines near the Southern Domain gate house spaced the same distance apart as the two close to the observatory, centred exactly on the same north–south alignment extending through the gap in the transit stones (on the Great Western Highway) which probably mark the location of a marker stone), the Observatory Memorial (1880) obelisk and archaeological remains of the footings of both the  square observatory with its northern and southern domed ends and the former astronomer's cottage to its west.

Other buildings include(d):
 Westmead Gatehouse
 Governors' Bathhouse (now a gazebo/pavilion)
 Governor's Stables (demolished to construct the 1855 railway extension from Parramatta to Penrith)
 Dairy Complex and Salter's Cottage

Timeline 

 1788: Government Farm founded at Rose Hill, and wheat, barley, corn and oats were planted in June and July that year. Part of the farm was in the Crescent of Parramatta Park, a former anabranch of the Parramatta River.
 1790: Governor Phillip laid out the area of the Domain as part of the Parramatta township. It was located on the western edge of the original township, and contained a Governor's residence, stockyards, lumber yard, and the redoubt. It was also used for grazing and food cultivation, grazing continuing until 1900. Under Phillip a town plan was surveyed that included High Street (now George Street), running between the planned site of Government House and "The Landing Place", further down the river. These were built of wattle and daub with thatched roofs, and measured . Convicts built the new street and huts from July 1790. From the early 1810s these were occupied by emancipated convicts and free settlers. From 1814/5 the huts were in disrepair and many were demolished as part of landscaping by Governor and Mrs Macquarie who pushed back (east) the township to create an expanded Governor's Domain. Huts were still standing outside the Domain in 1822 (now part of the Law Courts/Attorney-General's/Bloodbank/Parramatta District Hospital site).
 1800–10 Governor King appears to have set up Australia's first public botanic garden, under Sir Joseph Banks' personal plant collector, George Caley, on the Government Farm. Caley also used Old Government house to mount and treat his plant collection/specimens. The character of the Domain was changed by the gradual removal of the stockyards, lumber yard etc. to other areas of the township and by Governor Macquarie who extended the domain east to O'Connell St and reworked the site according to currently fashionable picturesque principles. River Road dates to the Macquarie period.
 1822: Governor Brisbane's observatory built on Coronation Hill
 1823: Governor Brisbane's bath house built, completed in 1823, on Coronation Hill. Water pumped ex river, heated, drained to a duck pond near the Macquarie Street gatehouse
 1850: Railway surveys undertaken to determine the desired alignment of a rail track west of Parramatta.
 1858: Parramatta Park created as a Victorian People's Park for public access after much lengthy lobbying from the 1840s. Numerous adaptations, e.g.: additional paths, drives, planted avenues of trees, plantations, the George Street entrance - three playgrounds have been located near here (northwest of) since 1858.
 1860: railway easement, an avenue of English oaks was planted along the length of River Road in the 1860s
 1886: Governor Brisbane's former bath house converted into an open arched rooved pavilion
 1904: Boer War Memorial and cannon erected, memorial re-cycling Doric columns off the former Parramatta Court house complex, on the southwest corner of Church & George Streets
 1911: Memorial to Parramatta resident William Hart, first Australian to fly a plane on a cross-country flight, from Penrith to Parramatta, touching down in the park on 4 November. The flight took 23 minutes.
 1967: dedication of Old Government House
Stadium Trust has had control of the stadium and surrounds since March 1989.
 : Burramatta Visitors' Centre (then kiosk) built, designed by Tonkin Zulaikha
 1990s: Visitor's Centre renovated, interpretive display on park heritage installed.
 1998: major refurbishment of George Street entry playground area including excavation to  depth and excavation of 30 post holes – an archaeological monitoring program accompanied the works. (finding a largely intact soil profile to a depth of greater than  beneath the playground).
 2003: Sealing and edging River Road, and two car park areas north and south of the Burramatta visitors' centre, construction of a bus/set-down bay and minor drainage improvements
 2004 approval for demolition of three existing toilet blocks and construction of new amenities around the park.
 2010: Lady Fitzroy memorial obelisk: commenced conservation (underpinning) works; commenced comprehensive assessment of Park archaeological collection; completed research for a publication on World Heritage Area values; completed conservation of Pitt Street 1880s dwarf stone/iron palisade fence; finished Parramatta River bank restoration project to restore eroded banks and improve access; footpath and cycleway improvements; resurfacing of Railway Parade, Governor Macquarie Carriageway and Federal Avenue; built  shared path on northern riverbank from Old Kings Oval to O'Connell Street; planted Sydney Coastal River-Flat Forest species and Aboriginal food and fibre plants as part of Burramatta Aboriginal Landscape trail; built two concrete cricket wickets

Heritage listings 
On 2 April 1999, the property was listed on the New South Wales State Heritage Register as a site of State significance with the following citation:

The Old Government House and the Government Domain were included in the Australian National Heritage List on 1 August 2007.

In July 2010, at the 34th session of the UNESCO World Heritage Committee, Old Government House and Domain, as well as ten other Australian sites with a significant association with convict transportation, were inscribed as a group on the World Heritage List as the Australian Convict Sites. The listing explains that the 11 sites present "the best surviving examples of large-scale convict transportation and the colonial expansion of European powers through the presence and labour of convicts". Of the 11 sites the Hyde Park Barracks, Old Great North Road and Cockatoo Island are also within the Sydney region. At the time of nomination, on 12 January 2007, Old Government House was described as a "powerful symbol of the colony of New South Wales, the inter-connections with convict sites in other colonies, and the development of the nation."

See also 

 First Government House, Sydney, residence of the Governor from 1788 to 1845
 Government House, Sydney, the present residence of the Governor 
 Cranbrook, Bellevue Hill, the residence of the Governor from 1900 to 1914
 Government Houses of Australia
 List of National Trust properties in Australia

References

Attribution 

  This Wikipedia article was originally based on the Old Government House, the Parramatta Park and Old Government House, and the Dairy Cottage, listed on the "New South Wales State Heritage Register" published by the Government of New South Wales under CC-BY 3.0 AU licence (accessed on 27 September 2017).

External links 

Old Government House - National Trust of Australia (NSW)
Friends of Old Government House
UNESCO announcement of World Heritage listing

Museums in Sydney
Australian Convict Sites
Old Colonial Georgian architecture in Australia
1799 establishments in Australia
National Trust of Australia
Historic house museums in New South Wales
Parramatta
Houses in Parramatta
New South Wales State Heritage Register
Government buildings in Sydney
Francis Greenway buildings
Walter Liberty Vernon buildings in Sydney
Articles incorporating text from the New South Wales State Heritage Register
Convictism in New South Wales
World Heritage Sites in New South Wales